The threadfin sea catfish (Arius arius), also called the Hamilton's catfish, marine catfish or jella, is a species of sea catfish in the family Ariidae. It was described by Francis Buchanan-Hamilton in 1822, originally under the genus Pimelodus. It is migratory and is found in tropical brackish and marine waters in the Indo-western Pacific region, including Bangladesh, India, Cambodia, Malaysia, the Philippines, Pakistan, Sri Lanka, Myanmar, Hong Kong, Thailand, Singapore, and China.

The diet of the threadfin sea catfish consists of finfish in the genus Stolephorus and silver bellies, as well as crabs, mollusks, prawns, and other invertebrates. It is of commercial interest to fisheries. The IUCN redlist currently rates the species as Least Concern due to its wide distribution and lack of known threats, although it states that the acquirement of empirical data on the effect of fisheries on the population may lead to a reassessment.

References

threadfin sea catfish
Catfish of Asia
Fish of the Indian Ocean
Marine fish of Asia
Marine fauna of Southeast Asia
Taxa named by Francis Buchanan-Hamilton
threadfin sea catfish